Rita of the West (also known as Crazy Westerners), is a 1967 Italian "musicarello"-Spaghetti Western film directed by Ferdinando Baldi.

Plot 
Little Rita is a traveling fun fighter, the "bestest in the West", who is helping the Native American chief Silly Bull with his goal to gather and destroy the white man's gold, which has ruined the world. To do this she has run-ins with parodies of popular western characters, including Django and Ringo. She is captured by Mexican bandit Sancho and his men, who want the secret to where the gold is being hidden (in a cave near the Native American village). Though she refuses to talk, she is rescued by Black Star, a cowboy from "far away", who saw her get kidnapped. She takes him with her back to Silly Bull, but after she realizes she's in love with him, Black Star tries to steal the gold from the cave. Silly Bull turns him over to the "white man's" court, where he pleads guilty and is sentenced to death. He's extradited to the Native Americans to punish, but Rita talks Silly Bull into sparing him. He heads back to town where, after killing Sancho to prevent him robbing the bank, he makes the sheriff arrest him and pushes them to execute him because, though Silly Bull refused to do it, the sentence still stands. A native American overhears and goes back to the village where Rita and the others are getting ready to blow up the gold that evening. When she hears about Black Star, she heads back to the town and tries to get the sheriff to release Star. He refuses, but Star overhears her and comes out, since his cell is not locked. He agrees not to be hanged, and tells Rita he loves her. That night, they blow up the gold and have a party in town, during which Rita departs for "far away", and Star follows.

Cast 
 Rita Pavone: Little Rita
 Terence Hill: Black Star/Black Stan
 Lucio Dalla: Francis Fitzgerald Grawz
 Teddy Reno: Sheriff Teno
 Kirk Morris: Ringo
 Gordon Mitchell: Bisonte Seduto / Sitting Bison/Silly Bull
 Fernando Sancho: Sancho
 Pinuccio Ardia: Barman
 Livio Lorenzon: Dying Man 
 Nini Rosso:  Mexican Trumpet Player 
 Gino Pernice: Tribunal President Joseph

References

External links

1967 films
1967 Western (genre) films
1960s Western (genre) musical films
Italian Western (genre) musical films
Spaghetti Western films
Musicarelli
Films directed by Ferdinando Baldi
1960s Italian-language films
1960s Italian films